The Valve Index is a consumer virtual reality headset created and manufactured by Valve. Announced on April 30, 2019, the headset was released on June 28 of the same year. The Index is a second-generation headset and the first to be manufactured completely by Valve. Half-Life: Alyx is bundled in with the headset.

Technical specifications

Display 
The headset uses an IPS fast switching 1440×1600 LCD panel for each eye for a combined resolution of 2880×1600. The panels are full RGB and can operate at refresh rates of 80, 90, 120, or 144 Hz. The specified field of view is 130°, but users report a practical field of view of 120°. The panels and lenses can be moved horizontally to adjust the user's inter-pupillary distance (IPD) using a physical slider underneath the displays. The allowable IPD adjustment ranges between 58 and 70mm.

Tracking 
The headset and controllers both support Valve's Lighthouse 2.0 tracking system, while retaining full compatibility with all previous HTC Vive base stations, using SteamVR.

Controls 
The headset is intended to be used with the Valve Index Controllers—known during development as the Knuckles Controllers—but is also backward compatible with the HTC Vive and HTC Vive Pro controllers. The Valve Index Controllers have a joystick, touchpad, two face buttons, a menu button, a trigger, and an array of 87 sensors that allow the controllers to track hand position, finger position, motion, and pressure to create an accurate representation of the user's hand in virtual reality. In addition, the controllers include an accelerometer for additional measurements.

Audio 
The Index includes "a pair of ultra near-field, full range, off-ear (extra-aural) headphones", which use BMR drivers to create accurate and immersive low frequency sounds, as well as a microphone.

History

Development 
The Valve Index is Valve's first virtual reality headset developed and manufactured in house, and is planned to be the launch console for Valve's upcoming virtual reality games. Development on a completely first party headset started some time around 2015 according to interviews with staff, before the release of their Vive headset with HTC. In February 2021, Valve registered patents for a new VR headset, describing the improvements over the previous model.

Release 
It sold an estimated 149,000 sets in 2019, 103,000 of which were in the fourth quarter due to the announcement of Half-Life: Alyx, which buyers received for free. The sudden demand caused the unit to be sold out in all 31 countries except Japan in January 2020. As of December 2019, 6.67% of the VR units connected to Steam are Valve Index sets. While Valve had anticipated supply for many of those that had ordered the Index in time for the March 2020 release of Half-Life: Alyx, the COVID-19 pandemic impacted production of the Index which left Valve with a reduced number of units available on the release date.

See also 
 Reality Labs
 VirtualLink

References

External links
 
 Valve Index on VRcompare

Virtual reality headsets
American inventions
Products introduced in 2019
Valve Corporation
Wearable devices